Ghorawal is a constituency of the Uttar Pradesh Legislative Assembly covering the city of Ghorawal in the Sonbhadra district of Uttar Pradesh, India.

Ghorawal is one of five assembly constituencies in the Robertsganj Lok Sabha constituency. Since 2008, this assembly constituency is numbered 400 amongst 403 constituencies.

Election results

2022

2017
Bharatiya Janta Party candidate Anil Kumar Maurya won in 2017 Uttar Pradesh Legislative Elections defeating Samajwadi Party candidate Ramesh Chandra by a margin of 57,649 votes.

References

External links
 

Assembly constituencies of Uttar Pradesh
Sonbhadra district